Dutton is a ghost town in Elko County, in the U.S. state of Nevada.

History
A post office was established at Dutton in 1907, and remained in operation until it was discontinued in 1913. Growth of nearby Midas, Nevada spelled the end of Dutton.

References

Ghost towns in Nevada
Ghost towns in Elko County, Nevada